Tännesberg is a municipality in the district of Neustadt an der Waldnaab in Bavaria, Germany.

Population development including incorporations

Mayors
2002-2008: Matthias Grundler
2008–2020: Max Völkl (independent)
since 2020: Ludwig Gürtler (independent)

References

Neustadt an der Waldnaab (district)